Lewis Palfrey (born 25 February 1990) is a professional rugby league footballer who plays as a stand-off or fullback for the Rochdale Hornets in the Betfred Championship.

Palfrey began his career at the Salford City Reds. He has also played for Whitehaven, Batley Bulldogs and Oldham.

References

External links
Rochdale Hornets profile
Oldham R.L.F.C. profile

Living people
1990 births
Oldham R.L.F.C. players
Whitehaven R.L.F.C. players
Batley Bulldogs players
Rochdale Hornets players
Rugby league five-eighths
Rugby league fullbacks
Salford Red Devils players